Calamba Island, (popularly known as Wonder Island Resort) and also known as Wonder Island Calamba, is an island resort, being part of Calamba in Laguna, situated in the middle of Laguna de Bay. This island is part of barangays Lingga and Palingon.

References

Laguna de Bay
Buildings and structures in Calamba, Laguna
Tourist attractions in Laguna (province)